Cassino is a comune in the Province of Frosinone, Lazio, Italy.
Cassino may also refer to:

Places
 Monte Cassino, a mountain near the commune of Cassino, Italy
 Praia do Cassino, a beach in the State of Rio Grande do Sul, Brazil

Arts, entertainment, and media
Cassino (band), an American band
Cassino (card game), an Italian card game

Organizations
A.S.D. Cassino Calcio 1924, Italian football club based in Cassino, Lazio region. Formerly known as "A.S.D. Nuova Cassino Calcio 1924". Their predecessor was known as "S.S. Cassino 1927"

See also
Casino (disambiguation)